The S band is a designation by the Institute of Electrical and Electronics Engineers (IEEE) for a part of the microwave band of the electromagnetic spectrum covering frequencies from 2 to 4 gigahertz (GHz). Thus it crosses the conventional boundary between the UHF and SHF bands at 3.0 GHz. The S band is used by airport surveillance radar for air traffic control, weather radar, surface ship radar, and some communications satellites, especially those used by NASA to communicate with the Space Shuttle and the International Space Station. The 10 cm radar short-band ranges roughly from 1.55 to 5.2 GHz. The S band also contains the 2.4–2.483 GHz ISM band, widely used for low power unlicensed microwave devices such as cordless phones, wireless headphones (Bluetooth), wireless networking (WiFi), garage door openers, keyless vehicle locks, baby monitors as well as for medical diathermy machines and microwave ovens (typically at 2.495 GHz). India's regional satellite navigation network (IRNSS) broadcasts on 2.483778 to 2.500278 GHz.

WiFi
The largest use of this band is by WiFi networks; the IEEE 802.11b and 802.11g standards use the 2.4 GHz section of the S band. These are the most widely used computer networks in the world, used globally in home and small office networks to link desktop and laptop computers, tablet computers, smartphones, smart TVs, printers, and smart speakers together and to a wireless router to connect them to the Internet, and in wireless access points in public places like coffee shops, hotels, libraries and airports to provide the public Internet access for mobile devices.

Mobile Services

Mobile Services are operated in the 2.3 GHz to 2.6 GHz range, specifically between the 2300 - 2400 MHz band and the 2500 - 2690 MHz band. Spectrum in the 3.55 - 3.7 GHz band has been auctioned off in the United States to be used for CBRS services and spectrum between 3.45 - 3.55 GHz and 3.7 - 3.98 GHz has been auctioned off by the FCC for 5G although this spectrum is referred to as C Band by the agency.

Satellite communications

In the United States, the FCC approved satellite-based Digital Audio Radio Service (DARS) broadcasting in the S band from 2.31 to 2.36 GHz in 1995, currently used by Sirius XM Radio. More recently, it has approved portions of the S band between 2.0 and 2.2 GHz for the creation of Mobile Satellite Service (MSS) networks in connection with Ancillary Terrestrial Components (ATC). There have been a number of companies attempting to deploy such networks, including ICO Satellite Management (now Pendrell Corporation) and TerreStar (defunct).

The 2.6 GHz range is used for China Multimedia Mobile Broadcasting, a satellite radio and mobile TV standard which, as with proprietary systems in the United States, is incompatible with the open standards used in the rest of the world.

In May 2009, Inmarsat and Solaris Mobile (a joint venture between Eutelsat and SES, now EchoStar Mobile) were each awarded a 2×15 MHz portion of the S band by the European Commission. The two companies are allowed two years to start providing pan-European MSS services for 18 years. Allocated frequencies are 1.98 to 2.01 GHz for Earth to space communications, and from 2.17 to 2.2 GHz for space to Earth communications. The Eutelsat W2A satellite was launched in April 2009 and is located at 10° East.

In some countries, S band is used for Direct-to-Home satellite television (unlike similar services in most countries, which use Ku band). The frequency typically allocated for this service is 2.5 to 2.7 GHz (LOF 1.570 GHz).

IndoStar-1 was the world's first commercial communications satellite to use S-band frequencies for broadcast, which efficiently penetrate the atmosphere and provide high-quality transmissions to small-diameter 80 cm antennas in regions that experience heavy rainfall such as Indonesia. Similar performance is not economically feasible with comparable Ku- or C-band DTH satellite systems since more power is required in these bands to penetrate the moist atmosphere.

The James Webb Space Telescope, launched in 2021, utilizes 2 GHz S-band to enable 40 kbps real time telemetry.

Other uses

Microwave ovens operate at 2495 or 2450 MHz in the ISM band IEEE 802.16a. Some digital cordless telephones operate in this band too. 802.16e standards use a part of the frequency range of S band; under WiMAX standards most vendors are now manufacturing equipment in the range of 3.5 GHz. The exact frequency range allocated for this type of use varies between countries.

In North America,  is an ISM band used for unlicensed spectrum devices such as cordless phones, wireless headphones, and video senders, among other consumer electronics uses, including Bluetooth which operates between 2.402 GHz and 2.480 GHz.

Amateur radio and amateur satellite operators have two S-band allocations, 13 cm (2.4 GHz) and 9 cm (3.4 GHz). Amateur television repeaters also operate in these bands.

Airport surveillance radars typically operate in the 2700–2900 MHz range.

Particle accelerators may be powered by S-band RF sources. The frequencies are then standardized at 2.998 GHz corresponding to a wavelength of 100 mm (Europe) or 2.856 GHz (US).

The National NEXRAD Radar network operates with S-band frequencies. Before implementation of this system, C-band frequencies were commonly used for weather surveillance.

In the United States, the 3.55 to 3.7 GHz band is becoming shared spectrum under rules adopted by the Federal Communications Commission in April 2015 as a result of the National Broadband Plan (United States). The biggest user of CBRS (Citizens Broadband Radio Service) spectrum is the United States Navy. Cable companies are planning to use the band for wireless broadband in rural areas, with Charter Communications beginning tests of the service in January 2018.

The band is also used as a transmit intermediate frequency in satellite communications as a replacement for L band where a single/shared coaxial connection is used between the modem/IDU and antenna/ODU for both the transmit and receive signals. This is to prevent interference between the transmit and receive signals which would otherwise not occur on a dual coaxial setup where the transmit and receive signals are separate and both can use the whole L-band frequency range. In a single coaxial connection using S-Band to "frequency shift" the transmit signal away from L band, a multiplier such as 10, is usually applied to form the SHF frequency. For example, the modem would transmit at 2.815 GHz IF (S Band) to the ODU and then the ODU up-converts this signal to 28.15 GHz SHF (Ka Band) towards the satellite.

Optical communications
S band is also used in optical communications to refer to the wavelength range 1460 nm to 1530 nm.

See also
 Electromagnetic interference at 2.4 GHz
 ISM band
 Unified S-band, an S-band communication system used in the Apollo program of crewed spaceflight

References

External links

Microwave bands
Telecommunications equipment